George Louis Scales (August 16, 1900 - April 15, 1976), nicknamed "Tubby", was an American second baseman and manager in Negro league baseball, most notably with the New York Lincoln Giants and Baltimore Elite Giants. Born in Talladega, Alabama, he batted .319 over a 25-year career during which he played several positions.

Buck Leonard claimed that George Scales was the best curveball hitter he ever saw.

At age 52, Scales received votes listing him on the 1952 Pittsburgh Courier player-voted poll of the Negro leagues' best players ever.

After retiring from baseball in 1958, he became a stockbroker. He died at age 75 in Compton, California.

Scales was among 39 final candidates considered for the Baseball Hall of Fame's Class of 2006 by the Committee on African-American Baseball, however he was not among the 17 elected.

On November 5, 2021, he was selected to the final ballot for the Baseball Hall of Fame's Early Days Committee for consideration in the Class of 2022. He received eight of the necessary twelve votes.

References

External links
 and Baseball-Reference Black Baseball stats and Seamheads
Negro League Baseball Museum

Philadelphia Stars players
Newark Stars players
People from Talladega, Alabama
Caribbean Series managers
Negro league baseball managers
1900 births
1976 deaths
20th-century African-American sportspeople
Baseball infielders